Miguel Avellán, O.F.M. (24 April 1580 – October 1650) was a Roman Catholic prelate who served as Auxiliary Bishop of Toledo (1633–1650).

Biography
Miguel Avellán was born in Huéscar, Spain and ordained a priest in the Order of Friars Minor in 1600.  On 20 June 1633 he was selected by the King of Spain and confirmed by Pope Urban VIII as Auxiliary Bishop of Toledo and Titular Bishop of Siriensis. He served as Auxiliary Bishop of Toledo until his death in October 1650.

Episcopal succession
As auxiliary bishop of a prominent Spanish archdiocese, he participated in many of the country's consecration of bishops serving as the principal consecrator of:
Antonio González Acevedo, Bishop of Almería (1634); 

and principal co-consecrator of:

See also
Catholic Church in Spain

References

1580 births
1650 deaths
17th-century Roman Catholic bishops in Spain
Bishops appointed by Pope Urban VIII